"Set Me Free" is a song recorded by South Korean girl group Twice. It was released as the lead single of their twelfth extended play Ready to Be on March 10, 2023. It is a disco song characterized by a groovy, synth, bass line, with lyrics revolving around the protagonists finding their own courage to confess their love to a crush. It was written by Melanie Fontana, Marty Maro, Star Wars, Jvde and Lindgren who also handled the production.

Background
On February 3, 2023, the group officially announced the single release for March 10. Individuals concept photos, as well as the group's concept photos for the song, were released on their official YouTube account. In an interview with KBS News, Jeongyeon revealed that they had been working on the song since the previous year. Nayeon noted that the new song shows a different side of Twice, saying "Since this is our first comeback in 7 months and our first comeback in 2023, we prepared hard to show our fans a new side of us…I am excited because I think I will be able to show a different concept and performance from my previous work."

Composition
"Set Me Free" is a disco track that takes a retro-futuristic approach, characterized by groovy, synth, bass line, "simple yet powerful sound", and liberating lyrics. The lyrics revolve around the protagonists finding the courage to confess their love to a crush, with lines such as "I've been hiding how I feel for you forever" and "Now that it's off my chest there's room for you and me". Member Jihyo explained that "Set Me Free" holds the meaning of "Let's break away from everything that binds us and love freely, to our heart's content." The song was composed in the key of F minor with a tempo of 113 beats per minutes.

Music video
The music video alternates between two sets, a lonely planet in outer space where they perform the song's choreography and a soundstage designed to look like a small town. After the bridge, a false ending is implemented, where the Twice's end screen (consisting of the logos of the group and their entertainment company JYP) is revealed to be shown on a cinema screen that the members watch.

Mina explained the meaning behind the music video, saying "it captures the image of Twice becoming more free". She also explained that each member expressed a different kind of freedom.

Promotion 
On February 20, a snippet of "Set Me Free" was revealed on TikTok before the song's official release. On March 4 and 5, Twice opened "Twice Pop-up Experience" in Los Angeles to communicate and celebrate the release of "Set Me Free" with their fans, where they teased part of the song's choreography. Twice performed the song for the first  time on The Tonight Show Starring Jimmy Fallon on the same day of its release.

Accolades

Track listing
Remixes
"Set Me Free" (English version) – 3:01
"Set Me Free" – 3:01
"Set Me Free" (Lindgren remix) [English version] – 3:31
"Set Me Free" (Lindgren remix) – 3:31
"Set Me Free" (Tommy "TBHits" Brown remix) [English version] – 2:50
"Set Me Free" (Tommy "TBHits" Brown remix) – 2:50
"Set Me Free" (ARMNHMR remix) [English version] – 2:58

Credits and personnel
Credits adopted from Melon.
 Twice – vocals
 Stars Wars (Galactika) – lyricist
 Jvde (Galactika) – lyricist, vocals director
 Melanie Fontana – composer, background vocals 
 Marty Maro – composer
 Lindgren – composer, arranger, producer
 Friday (Galactika) – vocals director 
 Nicole Neely – strings
 Lee Kyung-won – digital editing
 Gu Hye-jin – recording
 Im Chan-mi – recording
 Curtis Douglas – mixing
 Kwon Nam-woo – mastering
 Haneul Lee – immersive mix engineer
 Jung-hoon Choi – immersive mix engineer

Charts

Release history

References 

Twice (group) songs
2023 singles
2023 songs
Disco songs
Korean-language songs
Republic Records singles
JYP Entertainment singles